Estadio Reales Tamarindos is a multi-use stadium in Portoviejo, Ecuador.  It is currently used mostly for football matches and is the home stadium of Liga Deportiva Universitaria de Portoviejo.  The stadium has a capacity of 21,000 spectators and opened in 1970.

Reales Tamarindos
Copa América stadiums
Buildings and structures in Manabí Province